Pit Inn is a live album by pianist Cedar Walton recorded at the Pit Inn jazz club in Tokyo in 1974 and released on the Japanese East Wind label.

Track listing 
All compositions by Cedar Walton except as indicated
 "Suite Sunday" – 10:01
 "Con Alma" (Dizzy Gillespie) – 7:40   
 "Without A Song" (Vincent Youmans, Billy Rose, Edward Eliscu) – 8:50   
 "Suntory Blues" – 9:23    
 "Round Midnight" (Thelonious Monk) – 7:01    
 "Fantasy In 'D – 7:18    
 "Bleeker St. Theme" – 2:52

Personnel 
Cedar Walton – piano 
Sam Jones – bass
Billy Higgins – drums

References 

Cedar Walton live albums
1975 live albums
East Wind Records live albums